Quimper (or ) is a commune and prefecture of the Finistère department of Brittany in northwestern France.

Administration
Quimper is the prefecture (capital) of the Finistère department.

Geography
The city was built on the confluence of the Steir, Odet and Jet rivers.

Climate
Quimper has a oceanic climate (Köppen climate classification Cfb).

Etymology
The name Quimper comes from the Breton kemper, meaning "confluent".

History

Quimper is the ancient capital of Cornouaille, Brittany's most traditional region, and has a distinctive Breton Celtic character.  Its name is the Breton word kemper (cognate to Welsh cymer), meaning "confluence".  The town developed at the confluence of the rivers Le Steir and L'Odet. Shops and flags celebrate the region's Celtic heritage.

Quimper was originally settled during Roman times. By AD 495, the town had become a Bishopric. It subsequently became the capital of the counts of Cornouailles. In the eleventh century, it was united with the Duchy of Brittany.  During the War of the Breton Succession (1341–1364), the town suffered considerable ruin. In 1364, the duchy passed to the House of Montfort.

The town has a rustic atmosphere, with footbridges spanning the rivers that flow through it. The Church of Locmaria, a Romanesque structure, dates from the eleventh century. The Cathedral of Saint-Corentin, with its Gothic-style façade, was constructed between the thirteenth and sixteenth centuries. It is the oldest Gothic structure in lower Brittany. The fifteenth-century stained glass windows are exceptional. The cathedral is dedicated to Quimper's first bishop, Corentin.

To the cathedral's west are the pedestrianised streets of Vieux Quimper (Old Quimper), which have a wide array of crêperies, half-timbered houses, and shops.  Near the Episcopal palace, which now holds the Musée départemental Breton (devoted to regional history, archaeology, ethnology and economy) are the ruins of the town's fifteenth-century walls.  Nearby is the Musée des beaux-arts de Quimper.  The museum has a nineteenth-century façade and an entirely rebuilt interior.  It houses a collection of fourteenth to twenty-first century paintings that includes works by François Boucher, Jean-Baptiste-Camille Corot, Jean-Baptiste Oudry and Peter Paul Rubens, along with canvases by such Pont-Aven School painters as Émile Bernard, Maurice Denis, Georges Lacombe, Maxime Maufra and Paul Sérusier.

The town's best known product is Quimper faience, tin-glazed pottery. It has been made here since 1690, using bold provincial designs of Jean-Baptiste Bousquet. Quimper has a museum devoted to faience. The town's eating establishments boast some of the best crêpes and cider in Brittany.  The town has also been known for copper and bronze work, food items, galvanised ironware, hosiery, leather, paper and woollen goods.

Population

The population data in the table and graph below refer to the commune of Quimper proper, in its geography at the given years. The commune of Quimper absorbed the former communes of Ergué-Armel, Kerfunteun and Penhars in 1959. Its inhabitants are called Quimpérois.

Breton language
The municipality launched a linguistic plan through Ya d'ar brezhoneg on 6 February 2008, to revive the teaching and use of Breton, the historic Celtic language of the region. In 2008, 4.61% of primary-school children attended bilingual schools.

Education
Quimper has several schools. These include two Diwan pre-schools, two Diwan primary schools and one Diwan collège (all specialise in use of Breton). In total, 287 students here attended a Diwan school in 2003–2004.

Winter Festival
Most French festivals are held in the summer season, but Quimper has a Winter Festival: Les Hivernautes. In the summer, you can also find concerts on street corners, with pipers and accordion players.

Local points of interest

 Quimper Cathedral. This cathedral has a remarkable bend in its middle.
 churches (Locmaria, Saint-Mathieu, Kerfeunteun, Ergue-Armel...)
 an old town centre with mediaeval fortifications and houses
 Musée des Beaux-Arts (near the cathedral)
 Festival de Cornouaille: traditional dance (last week of July)
 Faience museum
 Statue of Gradlon looking in the direction of Ys at Quimper Cathedral

Transport
Public transport in Quimper is provided by QUB. The network consists of seven urban bus routes and 16 suburban bus routes. During the summer months of July and August, an additional "beach" bus route is open to service.

The Gare de Quimper is the terminus of a TGV high-speed train line from Paris, which passes through Le Mans, Rennes and Vannes. Journey duration is approximately 3 hours 40 minutes. In addition, the following destinations are served by the TER Bretagne (the regional train network) :
 Quimper – Brest (1 hour 9 minutes)
 Quimper – Rennes (2 hours 15 minutes)

Quimper–Cornouaille Airport has flights to Paris and London City.

Personalities
Quimper was the birthplace of:

 Guillaume Hyacinthe Bougeant (1690–1743), Jesuit author
 Louis Billouart de Kervaségan, chevalier de Kerlérec (1704–1770), last French governor of Louisiana
 René Cardaliaguet (1875-2950), priest and writer
 Élie Catherine Fréron (1718–1776), critic and controversialist
 Franciscus Lé Livec de Trésurin (1726–1792), French Jesuit
 Yves-Joseph de Kerguelen-Trémarec (1734–1797), explorer, admiral, discoverer of the Kerguelen archipelago
 Rene-Marie Madec (1736–1784), adventurer, Nawab of India. See also René Madec
 Guillaume François Laennec (1748–1822), French physician
 René Laennec (1781–1826), physician, inventor of the stethoscope
 Max Jacob (1876–1944), poet, painter, writer and critic
 Corentin Louis Kervran (1901-1983), scientist
 Philippe Poupon (born 1954), sailor
 OBE Hélène Mansfield, Croesyceiliog Head Teacher
 William Stanger (born 1985), footballer
 Jean Failler, writer (The Adventures of Mary Lester)
 Jacques Villeglé (b. 1926), mixed-media artist
 Jean-Claude Andro (1937–2000), novelist
 Jessica Cérival (born 1982), athlete
 Jean-Michel Moal, accordionist of Red Cardell
 Dan Ar Braz (b. 1949), guitarist
 Charlie Le Gars (1989-), champion de bras de fer 2012, CBFRT Championnat de Bras de Fer des routiers tatoués médaille d'or 2012
 Anne Quemere (1966-), sailor and sportswoman

Twin towns – sister cities
Quimper is twinned with:

 Limerick, Ireland
 Remscheid, Germany
 Laurium, Greece
 Ourense, Spain
 Yantai, China
 Foggia, Italy

See also
 Ys
 Quimper faience
Communes of the Finistère department
François Bazin (sculptor)
List of works of the two Folgoët ateliers
"List of the works of Charles Cottet depicting scenes of Brittany"
Lionel Floch
Henri Alphonse Barnoin
 Henri Guinier

References

External links

 Official city council's website

 
Communes of Finistère
Prefectures in France